The women's 400 metres competition at the 2006 Asian Games in Doha, Qatar was held on 9 and 10 December 2006 at the Khalifa International Stadium.

Schedule
All times are Arabia Standard Time (UTC+03:00)

Records

Results 
Legend
DNS — Did not start

1st round 
 Qualification: First 3 in each heat (Q) and the next 2 fastest (q) advance to the final.

Heat 1

Heat 2

Final

References

External links 
Results – Final

Athletics at the 2006 Asian Games
2006